GovBizConnect, Inc. is a U.S.-based Software-as-a-Service (SaaS) company founded in 2015 to connect small and large business in the government contracting industry. It offers business-to-business and business-to-government solutions.

Background
GovBizConnect, Inc. is domiciled in Dover, Delaware and maintains a presence in Washington, D.C., Connecticut, and Colorado. In 2016, it was named a Top 100 GovTech brand by marketing analytics firm Onalytica. The company is part of the emerging GovTech movement that has been chronicled by data analytics firm CB Insights. The GovTech movement is closely related to the civic technology movement. Tom Skypek founded the company after seeing the inefficiencies in the system for finding business partners in the government contracting market.

See also
 Government Accountability Office

References

External links
 GovBizConnect - Official website

Defunct software companies of the United States
Booz Allen Hamilton
Startup accelerators
Government procurement in the United States